Daoudaouga is a town located in the Dikhil Region of Djibouti. It is situated approximately  western of the nation's capital city of Djibouti, and roughly  northern of Dikhil, the regional capital.

Overview
Nearby towns and villages include Yoboki (42 km), Dikhil (101 km) and Balho (35 km).

Populated places in Djibouti